Jang Jung is a South Korean former footballer. He mostly played as a defender.

Club career
He formerly played with FC Seoul (as then known Lucky-Goldstar Hwangso) in  South Korea, Perak FA and Singapore FA in Malaysia and Geylang United in Singapore.

Coaching career
He was recently working in Sri Lanka as a head coach for Sri Lanka national football team until April 2012.

On 19 July 2012, it was announced that Jang Jung will take over his former team Perak FA's head coach position from Norizan Bakar on an interim basis until the end of the 2012 Malaysia Cup campaign. His spell with Perak was a disappointing one, recording only one win, while suffering three draws and two defeats in six Malaysia Cup group stage matches, failing to qualify to the quarter-finals. His contract was not renewed after the Malaysia Cup exit.

International goals
Results list South Korea's goal tally first.

Honours

Player
Perak
Malaysia FA Cup: 1990

Singapore Lions
M-League: 1994
Malaysia Cup: 1994

Manager
Geylang United
S.League: 2001

Individual
S.League Coach of the Year: 2001

External links

References

1964 births
Living people
Association football defenders
South Korean footballers
South Korean expatriate footballers
South Korea international footballers
South Korean football managers
Busan IPark players
FC Seoul players
Seongnam FC players
K League 1 players
Singapore Premier League players
Expatriate footballers in Malaysia
Expatriate footballers in Singapore
South Korean expatriate sportspeople in Malaysia
Singapore FA players
Perak F.C. players
Geylang International FC head coaches
South Korean expatriate sportspeople in Singapore
Expatriate football managers in Singapore
Geylang International FC players
South Korean expatriate sportspeople in Sri Lanka
Expatriate football managers in Sri Lanka
Sri Lanka national football team managers
1984 AFC Asian Cup players
Singapore Premier League head coaches
Balestier Khalsa FC head coaches
Perak F.C. managers